The S14 is a railway service of the St. Gallen S-Bahn that provides half-hourly service between , in the Swiss canton of Thurgau, and  in southern Germany. THURBO, a joint venture of Swiss Federal Railways and the canton of Thurgau, operates the service.

Operations 
The hourly –Konstanz InterRegio 75 supplements the S14.

Route 

  – 

 Weinfelden
  (stops only on request)
 Berg (stops only on request)
  (stops only on request)
  (stops only on request)
  (stops only on request)
  (stops only on request)
 
 Konstanz

History 
The December 2013 timetable change applied the S14 designation to an existing half-hourly service between Weinfelden and Konstanz.

References

External links 

 Fahrplan Ost

St. Gallen S-Bahn lines
Rail transport in Baden-Württemberg
Transport in Thurgau